Dolní Novosedly is a municipality and village in Písek District in the South Bohemian Region of the Czech Republic. It has about 200 inhabitants.

Administrative parts
Villages of Chrastiny and Horní Novosedly are administrative parts of Dolní Novosedly.

Geography
It lies in the Tábor Uplands. The Podhorák pond is located in the municipality.

History
The first written mention of Dolní Novosedly is from 1517.

Transport
The I/29 road from Písek to Tábor passes through the municipality.

Sights
In Dolní Novosedly is a chapel from the 19th century.

References

External links

Villages in Písek District